Balsam Creek is a community located on Highway 63 in the district of Nipissing in Northern Ontario. The village is part of the unincorporated township of Phelps. It is located about 25 km north-east of the city of North Bay.

Communities in Nipissing District